Derlis Ramón Ayala Sanchez (born 7 January 1990) is a Paraguayan long-distance runner.

Career
Born in Ciudad del Este, he represented Paraguay at the South American Cross Country Championships in 2008, 2011, 2013 and 2014.

He is a member of Paraguay Marathon Club in the Federación Paraguaya de Atletismo. He won a bronze medal at the 2009 Pan American Junior Athletics Championships. He holds Paraguayan national records in mile run, 5000 metres, 10,000 metres and several road running distances.

He represented Paraguay at the 2009 Pan American Junior Athletics Championships in the 3000 m steeplechase and finished with a Bronze Medal timing in at 9:14.77.

He won the 2014 San Blas International Run in Ciudad del Este in 26:10 minutes.

At the 2014 South American Cross Country Championships, he finished in 22nd position of the Senior men's 12 km race event in a time of 42:02.61.

At the South American Athletics Grand Prix on 25 March 2015, he set a 10,000 m national record of 29:48.27 in Buenos Aires, Argentina.

Ayala then states "Athletics is my life. It's what takes me to many places, meet wonderful people. It does not matter the mode, the young people must practice any sport because that will maintain them far away from addictions, they'll be the best persons and they'll feel good and fill with pride their families."

2016 Olympic Games
In April 2016, Ayala achieved his qualification for the 2016 Olympic Games in a marathon in Rotterdam. Ayala recorded a time of 2:17:27s to reach qualification. Ayala signalled that he worked for more than ten years just to achieve it and clarified that it was not easy. During the marathon at the Games, Ayala protagonized an emotive moment and gesture. Ayala stopped to help his friend from infancy Federico Bruno, who was injured, and going against his own time, Ayala stayed with Bruno to motivate him as they both crossed the finished line together.

"I know Fede since we were kids, we used to train together at the Villa. It does not matter, delay a bit my arrival [to the finish line], this is about the Olympic spirit"' – Ayala spoke in an interview transcribed by Paraguay Marathon Club

Ayala was placed as 136 in the world after completing the marathon in 2:39:40s.

2017 South American Championships
In the 2017 South American Championships disputed in Luque, Ayala, who did not finish the 10, 000 metres, intended to earn a medal in the 5, 000 metres event, in which he concluded in 11th position, signalling that he was unhappy in an interview with Paraguayan news paper ABC Color. Ayala finished with a time of 15.00.30, in the event which Chilean athlete Victor Aravena finished in 1st place.

2020 Olympic Games
In September 2019, Ayala qualified for the 2020 Summer Olympics with an A result time of 02.10.31s in the Buenos Aires Marathon, achieving a new national record for Paraguay and converting himself into South American champion. In the same month, Ayala visited Paraguay's president Mario Abdo Benítez, who promised Ayala help in his preparation for the Games in Tokyo. His scholarship with the Secretaria Nacional de Deportes was also improved.

Competition record

International competitions

National championships

Circuit performances

References

External links

1990 births
Living people
Sportspeople from Ciudad del Este
Paraguayan male long-distance runners
Paraguayan male marathon runners
Paraguayan male steeplechase runners
Paraguayan male cross country runners
Olympic athletes of Paraguay
Athletes (track and field) at the 2016 Summer Olympics
Pan American Games competitors for Paraguay
Athletes (track and field) at the 2019 Pan American Games
South American Games competitors for Paraguay
Athletes (track and field) at the 2018 South American Games
Athletes (track and field) at the 2022 South American Games
Athletes (track and field) at the 2020 Summer Olympics
20th-century Paraguayan people
21st-century Paraguayan people